Stanlee Aideloje Ohikhuare known professionally as Stanlee Ohikhuare is a Nigerian filmmaker, cinematographer, and writer. He is known for producing short films. He obtained a diploma from a school of fine arts.

Filmography

Awards and nominations

References

External links 
 

Nigerian film producers
Nigerian film directors
Nigerian screenwriters
Year of birth missing (living people)
Living people
Nigerian cinematographers
Yoruba writers
Nigerian male film actors
Nigerian sound editors